Bogalusa School Board is a school district headquartered in Bogalusa, Louisiana, United States.

The district serves the City of Bogalusa, Rio, and some unincorporated areas of Washington Parish.

History
The school was racially integrated prior to 1970. Post-1970 the school's racial demographics consisted of approximately 60% white students and 40% black students.

By 2013, there was a major grade level (educational stage) reconfiguration and school merger, reducing the number of schools from five to three.

Schools
Schools are located in the City of Bogalusa.

Currently operating:
 Bogalusa High School
 Central Elementary School
 Byrd Avenue Primary School (formerly Byrd Avenue Elementary School)

Former schools:
Secondary:
 Bogalusa High School West
 Bogalusa Middle School - Was open after the reconfiguration
Elementary:
Northside Elementary School - Converted into a Assistance Center
Pleasant Hill Elementary School - Closed as part of the reconfiguration
Superior Avenue Elementary School - Closed as part of the reconfiguration
Pre-K
Denhamtown Elementary Pre-K

References

External links

 Bogalusa City Schools
 

School districts in Louisiana
Education in Washington Parish, Louisiana